Chinshwehaw is a town in Laukkaing Township, Laukkaing District, Shan State of Myanmar. The town is home to one of 5 official border trade posts with China, and opened on 19 October 2003.

References

Populated places in Shan State
China–Myanmar border crossings